Trélévern is a commune in the Côtes-d'Armor department of Brittany in northwestern France located at the intersection of the touristic Côte de granit rose (pink granite Coast) and the quieter and wilder Côte des ajoncs d'or (golden gorses Coast).

Population
Inhabitants of Trélévern are called trélévernais in French.

See also
Communes of the Côtes-d'Armor department

References

External links

Official website 

Communes of Côtes-d'Armor